Ľuboslav Laura (born 5 July 1994) is a Slovak footballer who plays for MFK Tatran Liptovský Mikuláš as a midfielder.

Club career

MFK Tatran Liptovský Mikuláš
Laura made his professional debut for MFK Tatran Liptovský Mikuláš against ŠK Slovan Bratislava on 24 July 2021.

References

External links
 MFK Tatran Liptovský Mikuláš official club profile 
 
 
 Futbalnet profile 

1994 births
Living people
Slovak footballers
Association football midfielders
MFK Dolný Kubín players
ŠKF Sereď players
MFK Tatran Liptovský Mikuláš players
Slovak Super Liga players
People from Dolný Kubín
Sportspeople from the Žilina Region